Rüstəmlı (also, Rəstəmli) is a village and municipality in the Yevlakh Rayon of Azerbaijan.  It has a population of 862.

References 

Populated places in Yevlakh District